The WWE Intercontinental Championship is a professional wrestling championship contested in and owned by the American promotion WWE on the SmackDown brand. The title was introduced into the World Wrestling Federation (WWF, now WWE) in 1979. Pat Patterson, holder of the WWF North American Heavyweight Championship, was awarded the title (with the kayfabe explanation that he won a tournament in Rio de Janeiro, Brazil and unified the North American and South American titles).

The Intercontinental Championship has been called the second most important championship in the company, after the WWE Championship. It has been active in WWE for the second-longest period, but is the third-oldest active title, behind the WWE Championship (1963) and the United States Championship (1975), the latter of which was acquired from World Championship Wrestling (WCW) in 2001. In 2002, the WWF was renamed World Wrestling Entertainment (WWE), and the championship was renamed accordingly. As a result of the 2019 WWE Superstar Shake-up, it is exclusively contested on the SmackDown brand.

Overall, there have been 89 different Intercontinental Champions. Chris Jericho holds the record for the most reigns with nine. The Honky Tonk Man holds the longest reign at 454 days. Only three other wrestlers, Pedro Morales, Don Muraco, and Randy Savage, have held the championship for a continuous reign of more than a year. Gunther is the current champion in his first reign. He defeated previous champion Ricochet on SmackDown in Baton Rouge, Louisiana on June 10, 2022.

Title history

Names

Reigns 
 

Combined reigns 

Notes

References

External links 
 Official WWE Intercontinental Championship Title History
 Wrestling-Titles.com: Intercontinental Championship

WWE championships lists